Terence John Quinn (October 16, 1836 – June 18, 1878) was an American Civil War veteran, businessman, and politician who served part of one term as a United States representative from New York from 1877 to 1878.

Biography 
He was born in Albany, New York, where he was educated at a private school and the Boys' Academy. Early in life entered the brewery business with his father and subsequently became a senior member of the firm.

Civil War 
At the outbreak of the American Civil War, he was commissioned as a second lieutenant in Company B, Twenty-fifth Regiment, New York State Militia Volunteers which was ordered to the defense of Washington, D.C. in April 1861. He was assigned to duty at Arlington Heights.

Political career 
Quinn was a member of the common council of Albany 1869-1872. He was elected a member of the State assembly in 1873.

Congress 
He was elected as a Democrat to the Forty-fifth (45th) Congress and served from March 4, 1877, until his death in Albany in 1878, aged 41.

Burial 
He was buried in St. Agnes Cemetery, Menands, New York.

See also
List of United States Congress members who died in office (1790–1899)

References

1836 births
1878 deaths
Politicians from Albany, New York
New York (state) lawyers
Union Army officers
Democratic Party members of the United States House of Representatives from New York (state)
19th-century American politicians
Lawyers from Albany, New York
19th-century American lawyers